These are the rosters of all participating teams at the men's water polo tournament at the 2015 World Aquatics Championships in Kazan, Russia.

Group A

Vinicius Antonelli
Jonas Crivella
Guilherme Gomes
Ives González
Paulo Salemi
Bernardo Gomes
Adrián Delgado
Felipe Costa e Silva
Bernardo Rocha
Felipe Perrone
Gustavo Guimarães
Josip Vrlić
Thyê Bezerra

Robin Randall
Con Kudaba
Oliver Vikalo
Nicolas Constantin-Bicari
Justin Boyd
David Lapins
Alec Taschereau
Kevin Graham
Matt Halajian
John Conway
George Torakis
Jerry McElroy
Dusan Aleksic

Wu Honghui
Tan Feihu
Hu Zhangxin
Dong Tao
Lu Wenhui
Li Li
Chen Zhongxian
Li Lun
Xie Zekai
Chen Jinghao
Zhang Chufeng
Liang Nianxiang
Liang Zhiwei

Josip Pavić
Damir Burić
Antonio Petković
Luka Lončar
Maro Joković
Luka Bukić
Petar Muslim
Andro Bušlje
Sandro Sukno
Fran Paškvalin
Anđelo Šetka
Paulo Obradović
Marko Bijač

Group B

Konstantinos Flegkas
Emmanouil Mylonakis
Georgios Dervisis
Konstantinos Genidounias
Ioannis Fountoulis
Kyriakos Pontikeas
Christos Afroudakis
Evangelos Delakas
Konstantinos Mourikis
Christodoulos Kolomvos
Alexandros Gounas
Angelos Vlachopoulos
Stefanos Galanopoulos

Stefano Tempesti
Francesco Di Fulvio
Alessandro Velotto
Pietro Figlioli
Alex Giorgetti
Andrea Fondelli
Massimo Giacoppo
Nicholas Presciutti
Niccolò Gitto
Stefano Luongo
Matteo Aicardi
Fabio Baraldi
Marco Del Lungo

Anton Antonov
Alexey Bugaychuk
Artem Odintsov
Igor Bychkov
Albert Zinnatullin
Artem Ashaev
Vladislav Timakov
Ivan Nagaev
Konstantin Stepaniuk
Dmitrii Kholod
Sergey Lisunov
Lev Magomaev
Victor Ivanov

Merrill Moses
Nikola Vavić
Alex Obert
Jackson Kimbell
Alex Roelse
Luca Cupido
Josh Samuels
Tony Azevedo
Alex Bowen
Bret Bonanni
Jesse Smith
John Mann
McQuin Baron

Group C

Diego Malnero
Ramiro Veich
Tomás Galimberti
Andrés Monutti
Emanuel López
Tomás Bulgheroni
Juan Pablo Montané
Esteban Corsi
Iván Carabantes
Julián Daszczyk
Franco Demarchi
Germán Yañez
Franco Testa

Viktor Nagy
Miklós Gór-Nagy
Norbert Madaras
Balázs Erdélyi
Márton Vámos
Norbert Hosnyánszky
Dániel Angyal
Márton Szívós
Dániel Varga
Dénes Varga
Krisztián Bedő
Balázs Hárai
Attila Decker

Aleksandr Fyodorov
Sergey Gubarev
Alexandr Axenov
Roman Pilipenko
Vladimir Ushakov
Alexey Shmider
Murat Shakenov
Anton Koliadenko
Rustam Ukumanov
Yevgeniy Medvedev
Ravil Manafov
Branko Pekovich
Valeriy Shlemov

Dwayne Flatscher
Etienne Le Roux
Devon Card
Ignardus Badenhorst
Nicholas Hock
Joao Marco de Carvalho
Dayne Jagga
Jared Wingate-Pearse
Dean Whyte
Pierre Le Roux
Nicholas Molyneux
Wesley Bohata
Julian Lewis

Group D

James Stanton-French
Richard Campbell
George Ford
John Cotterill
Nathan Power
Jarrod Gilchrist
Aiden Roach
Aaron Younger
Joel Swift
Mitchell Emery
Rhys Howden
Tyler Martin
Joel Dennerley

Katsuyuki Tanamura
Seiya Adachi
Atsushi Arai
Mitsuaki Shiga
Akira Yanase
Atsuto Iida
Yusuke Shimizu
Yuki Kadono
Koji Takei
Kenya Yasuda
Keigo Okawa
Shota Hazui
Tomoyoshi Fukushima

Dejan Lazović
Draško Brguljan
Vjekoslav Pasković
Uroš Čučković
Darko Brguljan
Aleksandar Radović
Mlađan Janović
Aleksa Ukropina
Aleksandar Ivović
Nikola Murišić
Filip Klikovac
Predrag Jokić
Miloš Šćepanović

Gojko Pijetlović
Dušan Mandić
Živko Gocić
Sava Ranđelović
Miloš Ćuk
Duško Pijetlović
Slobodan Nikić
Milan Aleksić
Nikola Jakšić
Filip Filipović
Andrija Prlainović
Stefan Mitrović
Branislav Mitrović

See also
Water polo at the 2015 World Aquatics Championships – Women's team rosters

References

External links
Official website
Records and statistics (reports by Omega)

World Aquatics Championships water polo squads
Men's team rosters